HMS Cambria is the lead Royal Naval Reserve unit in Wales. It is based at Sully near the Welsh capital, Cardiff.

History
HMS Cambria was established as the Royal Naval Reserve unit for South Wales in July 1947 and originally occupied buildings in Cardiff Docks. Cambria remained in Cardiff until 1980, when the redevelopment of the docks there precipitated a move to the former service married couples' accommodation at Sully, Vale of Glamorgan in the Vale of Glamorgan. The unit was granted freedom of the vale in 2012, but is due to move to Cardiff Bay during 2020.

Over the years Cambria, like many other RNR units, operated a number of seagoing ships; a motor minesweeper - the unit's first tender - was replaced in 1954 by the wooden-hulled minesweeper Brereton, which gave way in turn to Crichton (1961-76); all of these were rechristened HMS St David. In 1978 the unit acquired a converted trawler, which was again renamed St David. The ship's final vessel, acquired in 1984, was the new minesweeper Waveney, which was not renamed. Waveney remained with HMS Cambria until 1994, when a reorganisation of the RNR led to the abandonment of seagoing tenders.

Cambria is one of only three RNR units to have a satellite unit. The Swansea-Tawe Division, based at Swansea, began its life as a Royal Naval Volunteer Reserve Wireless unit in 1932. Having originally begun life with just one recruit, the unit had expanded to 48 members by 1970. The unit was briefly commissioned as the stone frigate HMS Dragon from 1984 to 1994, but was subsequently made subordinate to Cambria and rechristened to its current name.

References

External links
HMS Cambria Royal Navy Website

Royal Navy bases in Wales
Royal Navy shore establishments
Vale of Glamorgan
Military installations established in 1947